The Gimcheon Stadium is a multi-purpose stadium in Gimcheon, South Korea. It is currently used mostly for football matches and is the home stadium of the K League 2 team Gimcheon Sangmu FC. The stadium has a seating capacity for 25,000 spectators.

References

External links
 World Stadiums

Football venues in South Korea
Multi-purpose stadiums in South Korea
Sports venues in North Gyeongsang Province
Sports venues completed in 2000
2000 establishments in South Korea
K League 2 stadiums
K League 1 stadiums